Reginald Openshaw Lawson (November 1880 – ?) was an English footballer. His regular position was as a forward. He was born in Bolton. He played for Manchester United and Bolton Wanderers.

External links
MUFCInfo.com profile

1880 births
English footballers
Manchester United F.C. players
Bolton Wanderers F.C. players
Year of death missing
Association football forwards